The Thames Trader was a range of trucks manufactured by Ford UK built between 1957 and 1965.

Forward Control models

Design
The distinctive cab design, which sets it apart from other British commercial vehicles, was a forward-control (or semi-forward control) design and the Thames Trader model covered a much wider weight range than the existing normal control ET Thames model or the earlier forward control 7V model. Both these earlier models had been based on Ford of America designs; the new Thames Trader was the first heavy commercial to be designed by Ford of Britain (although looking at the headlight surrounds suggests a family resemblance to the American Ford C series truck of the mid 1950s).

Mechanicals and wheelbase types
The Thames Trader model range covered weights from 2 to 7 tons, powered by either petrol or diesel engines in four- or six-cylinder guises. The lower-weight vehicles were available with 118- and 138-inch wheelbases, the heavy weight vehicle with 138-, 152- and 160-inch wheelbases; there was also a 108-inch tipper wheelbase. In addition there was a low-frame chassis model – typically used for furniture van bodywork.

Mk2
A Mk 2 version was introduced in mid-1962. Externally it is very easy to differentiate between Mk1 and Mk2 versions; the Mk1 has the words THAMES TRADER in red on a chrome strip along the bottom of the bonnet opening and the white painted grill between the headlights has a vertical divider with a red circular badge with 4 stars, whereas the Mk2 has just the word THAMES under the bonnet, and TRADER in white letters spaced out between the headlights replacing the divider and badge. The Mk2 Diesel engined variants had either a 4D or 6D chrome badge on each front wing, on the Mk1 it was a squarish chrome badge with either a red painted 4, 6, 4D or 6D to indicate the engine configuration. The lower edge of the badge had a horizontal chrome strip running the length of the lower part of the wing.

Normal Control models
Ford commenced production of the Thames Trader NC at the Dagenham factory in England in 1962. It used the cabin developed by Ford Germany for their slow-selling Ford Köln truck. The NC designation indicated "normal control", as opposed to "forward control". After the discontinuation of the Thames brand in 1965 the NC was re-designated as the K Series. Ford Europe would not step in again on the normal control heavy-duty van segment until 1973 with the Ford A-Series, which was based on the smaller Ford Transit.

London Transport use
London Transport ordered five double decker buses based on the Thames Trader for special duties, taking cyclists through the Dartford Tunnel. These had a lower deck purpose built for carrying bicycles, with the upper deck for cyclists. Unusually, these buses had their stairwell several feet above the level of the road, accessible by a ladder. The service was later dropped in 1965, owing to lack of cycle traffic and possibly the design.

Gallery

References

External links

  Ford Thames Trader at Heritage Machines
  Thames Trader at National Road Transport Hall of Fame (Australia)

Thames Trader
Ford trucks
Vehicles introduced in 1957
Rear-wheel-drive vehicles